Jiří Novák was the defending champion but lost in the semifinals to Kenneth Carlsen.

Jonas Björkman won in the final 7–6(7–0), 6–0 against Carlsen.

Seeds
A champion seed is indicated in bold text while text in italics indicates the round in which that seed was eliminated.

  Marcelo Ríos (quarterfinals)
 n/a
  Alberto Berasategui (second round)
  Àlex Corretja (first round)
  Hernán Gumy (quarterfinals)
  Chris Woodruff (second round)
  Greg Rusedski (first round)
  Martin Damm (first round)

Draw

External links
 1997 BellSouth Open draw

ATP Auckland Open
1997 ATP Tour